William Barbour may refer to:
 William Warren Barbour (1888–1943), United States Senator for New Jersey
 William Boyle Barbour (1828–1891), Scottish merchant and politician
 William H. Barbour Jr. (born 1941), United States federal judge
 William Barbour Linen Thread Company of Hilden, owned by the family of Milne Barbour
 Billy Barbour (1865–1900), Scottish footballer

See also
William Barber (disambiguation)